Roger Dajoz (22 August 1929 - 2019) was a French biologist, ecologist and entomologist, former student of the Ecole Normale Supérieure and a teacher at the Museum national d'histoire naturelle in Paris.

Biography 

He published a lot of books on ecology, entomology and biology. One of the most important is an Ecology dictionary named Précis d'écologie, published by Dunod in French.

He married Aline Langevin, anglicist and French physicist Paul Langevin's granddaughter. They gave birth to two daughters, Isabelle Dajoz, who is a biologist and a teacher at Université Denis Diderot, and Hélène Dajoz, who is a teacher in mathematics.

Publications 

 Insecticides, PUF, 1959.
 Wood-boring insects and their part in deadwood degradation in Forest ecology, Gauthier-Villars, 1974.
 Ecology collection, vol.6, Population dynamics, Masson, 1974.
 The ecology encyclopedia : the present in question, with other contributors, Larousse, 1977.
 Ecology dictionary, Dunod, 2006.
 Biodiversity, the future of man and the planet, Ellipses, 2009.
 Biologic evolution in the 21st century, facts and theories, Lavoisier, 2012.

References

French ecologists
1929 births
2019 deaths
Place of birth missing
Langevin family
National Museum of Natural History (France) people